This is a list collecting the most notable films produced in Hungary and in the Hungarian language during 1990–.

1990s

2000s

2010s

2020s

References

External links
Hungarian film at the Internet Movie Database

1990